High Tech High Chula Vista is a charter school located in Chula Vista, California. The high school, being open-campus and project based, opened in the fall 2007 with approximately 150 9th grade students. Students are admitted into the school through a randomized lottery acceptance system to bring diversity.

References

External links
 

High schools in San Diego County, California
Charter high schools in California
Education in Chula Vista, California
High Tech High charter schools
2007 establishments in California